Tamasha (transl. Spectacle/Drama) is the  first season of the Pakistani reality TV programme 
Tamasha Ghar. It premiered on 20 August 2022 on ARY Digital. Unlike other versions of Big Brother, the Pakistani version celebrities as housemates. It was hosted by Lollywood actor Adnan Siddiqui.
 The grand finale took place on 1 October 2022, where Umer Aalam emerged as the winner and Mareeha Safdar became the runner-up.

Housemates status

Housemates
The participants in the order of appearance and entered in house are:
Maira Khan – Television actress. She is known for portraying various roles in serials.
Nigah Jee – Choreographer.
Mareeha Safdar – Model and actress.
Syed Saim Ali – Television and film actor and presenter.
Faiza Khan – Actress. 
Nouman Javaid – Singer. He is known for his songs in the Hindi film JashanJashan.
Aamna Malick – Television Actress.
Umer Aalam – Television Actor and Model.
Humaira Ali – Model and actress.
Saeeda Imtiaz – Actress. Known for her role in the Pakistani film Wajood.
 Sehr Beg – Fitness trainer.
Aadi Adeal Amjad – Host and television presenter.
Rauf Lala – Comedian.

Weekly summary

Guest appearances

Through direct contact

Through video link

Nomination table

: Mareeha Saved herself from the nominations by winning the task "Token Walay or Rakhwalay".
: Rauf and Aamna were nominated as they were left with least tokens in the task "Token Walay or Rakhwalay".
: Umer was nominated by "Adnan Siddiqui" for violating house rules.
: Umer was saved by guests; Ahmed Shah, Abubakr Shah and Umer Shah.
: Umer, Rauf, Maira, Saeeda and Nigah lost the task "Tamasha Bank" against nominated contestants; Mareeha, Humaira, Aamna, Saim and Sehr were saved and as a result they were nominated.
: Rauf saved himself by winning the task.
: Everyone was nominated for eviction by "Adnan Siddiqui" except Noman by virtue of being Wazir of last week.
: Saim and Maira were saved as they won "Train Task".
: Saeeda got saved by winning the "Saanp Seerhi" task.
: Rauf got saved by winning the task.
: Due to violations in the puzzle task, all housemates were nominated by Adnan Siddiqui including Wazir Humaira.
: Mareeha saved herself by winning the task and became the Wazir.
: Saeeda saved herself by winning the task "Grabstick".
: Saim, Umer and Aadi got saved by winning tasks but Umer nominated himself and saved Rauf.
: Umer, Humaira and Noman evicted on Day 28. However, Humaira entered the house later the same day, where as Umer came back on Day 29.
: Aadi, Mareeha and Maira won ticket to finale week task and entered the final week.
: Humaira and Maira ejected from the house after physically assaulted.
^18 : On Day 35, elimination occurred. Saeeda and Saim get evicted while Umer and Rauf Lala become the last two finalists.

^19 : On Day 40 - out of the 6 finalists, Humaira and Maira get evicted due to violating the rules of physical violence. Saeeda re-enters as a guest to stay until the finale.
^20: Finale occurs on Day 43. The winner is decided by the votes of audience. Umer Aalam becomes the winner of Tamasha Season 1 while Mareeha Safdar becomes the Runner-up. Aadi Adeel Amjad becomes the second runner up while Rauf Lala becomes the third runner up.

References

Pakistani reality television series
2022 Pakistani television series debuts